This article summarized the comparison of movie cameras.

35 mm
The 35 mm film gauge has long been the most common gauge in professional usage, and thus enjoys the greatest number of cameras currently available for professional usage. The modern era of 35 mm cameras dates to 1972, when Arri's Arriflex 35BL and Panavision's original Panaflex models emerged as the first self-blimped, lightweight cameras. Another distinguishing characteristic of modern cameras is the adoption of stronger lens mount seatings secured with a breech lock – namely the Arri PL and PV mount, both of which were designs descended from the BNCR mount of Mitchell cameras.

General
 Camera model – specific camera body models and variants, usually officially authorized
 Camera line – either the body family (similar bodies) or system family (complementary design)
 Manufacturer – company of origin
 Introduced – first year of known usage
 Weight – usually just the body, but may include accessories as mentioned
 MOS/sync – Sync-sound cameras are able to both maintain a constant speed (usually crystal lock) and run quietly enough not to be heard by the sound recordist. MOS cameras do not meet either one or both of these requirements, and are usually used either for applications where camera noise is not a concern, or non-standard camera speeds are required. A camera is also deemed MOS if it cannot hold a constant speed, regardless of its noise levels.
 Noise level – measured noise made by the camera, dB(A), with film and at a given distance from the film plane, usually one meter. MOS cameras do not have a measured noise level since they are not intended to be used with recorded sound and thus are much louder.

A limited number of cameras prior to the modern period are listed due to their prevalence in special applications.

Lens and gate aperture
 Lens mount – the type of mount required for using the camera. Certain lenses may not be able to be used with particular cameras if the mounts are incompatible. The lens mount must be shifted to be centered to accommodate the Super 16 format from standard 16.
 Aperture size – the size of the aperture of the gate.
 Aperture plate – is the gate removable for inspection and what accessories may it have?
 Lens interface – electronic information system located in the lens mount to communicate lens data to the camera and accessories.
 Ground glass – interchangeable ground glasses allow for the viewfinder to display whichever aspect ratio is being framed for.
 Frameline glow – can the camera make the framelines glow for easier viewing in low-light conditions?

Shutter
 Reflex – is the shutter a reflex mirror design?
 Design – rotary disc shutters have two common designs – a "half-moon" disc of 180° or "butterfly" of two e.g. 90° segments opposite each other which spin at half-speed.
 Location – where the shutter is centered
 Adjustment – how the shutter angle can be adjusted. Most manual designs can only be adjusted when the camera is not running, often with the lens removed. All electronic shutters allow adjustment at all times, including when the camera is running.
 Angles – shutter angles available and in what increments or stops, if not continuous.

Movement
 Movement type – design of the movement mechanism
 Pulldown claws – number of claws which engage the film perforations to transport the film while the shutter is closed. Some claws may have more than one pin in order to engage multiple perfs at a time.
 Registration pins – number of pins which engage the film perforations during exposure in order to ensure consistent image stability from frame to frame.
 Frame rate (forward) – range of speeds in frame/s (frames per second) and smallest increments of change allowed. Accessories noted where required for certain speeds.
 Frame rate (reverse) – range of speeds in frame/s (frames per second) and smallest increments of change allowed. Accessories noted where required for certain speeds.
 Motor – type of motor, voltage, crystal-controlled speeds (Xtal)
 Pulldown – negative pulldown options available
 Pitch control? – does the camera allow for adjustment of the pulldown claw to optimize camera noise and avoid perforation damage?

Viewfinder

16 mm
16 mm film occupies a rather curious position within filmmaking – with a wide range encompassing virtually every field – amateur home movies, student films, experimental films, television work, commercials, music videos, corporate films, industrial research, medical applications, and lower budget features. Its robust image quality in relation to its size allows for a much more versatile, accessible, and affordable usage in many fields where neither 35 mm nor Super 8 would be well-suited. Despite current challenges from the burgeoning digital video market, the consistent improvement of cameras, lenses, and film stocks have enabled the Super 16 format to flourish recently, with many labs reporting increased usage. The modern era of 16 mm cameras is concurrent with that of 35 mm for both the same reasons as 35 mm as well as an additional change: the creation of the Super 16 format by Rune Ericsson in 1971. The format expanded the usable film negative horizontally, which required a larger film gate and necessitated either specialized conversion of machined parts or purchase of new cameras designed with Super 16 gates. Since the format took more than a decade to slowly standardize, the competition from both high and low end video cameras has decimated the demand for 16 mm cameras for most non-professional usage. Therefore, there are relatively few Super 16 cameras, although most are considered professional-grade.

General
A limited number of cameras prior to this period are listed due to their prevalence in special applications.

See also
 Comparison of digital SLRs

References

 Arri official site
 Aaton official site
 Arri. Arri: A Picture Chronicle, 2001
 Burum, Stephen (editor). American Cinematographer Manual, 9th edition. ASC Press, 2004
 Diaz-Amador, Jorge. "Cinema Technic: Camera History/Info", 2001–06
 Hummel, Rob (editor). American Cinematographer Manual, 8th edition. ASC Press, 2001.
 Kaczek, Frédéric G. "The History of Fritz Gabriel Bauer's Moviecam". PDF file formerly available at www.moviecam.com, 2002
 Moviecam History (official site)
 Panavision History (official site)

Movie cameras
Movie cameras